Malik Khaled Ahmed Louahla (Arabic:مالك خالد أحمد الواحلة; born 19 December 1977) is an Algerian sprinter, he specializes in the 200 and 400 metres.

In the 400m heats at the 2001 World Championships, Louahla ran a career best of 45.13 seconds. The following day, he ran a time of 45.14 seconds, but was eliminated from the competition in the semi-final. His personal best 200m time is 20.62 seconds, achieved in August 2004 in Algiers.

Competition record

References

External links

1977 births
Living people
Algerian male sprinters
Olympic athletes of Algeria
Athletes (track and field) at the 2000 Summer Olympics
Athletes (track and field) at the 2004 Summer Olympics
World Athletics Championships athletes for Algeria
Athletes (track and field) at the 1997 Mediterranean Games
Athletes (track and field) at the 2001 Mediterranean Games
Athletes (track and field) at the 2005 Mediterranean Games
Mediterranean Games gold medalists for Algeria
Mediterranean Games silver medalists for Algeria
Mediterranean Games medalists in athletics
Athletes (track and field) at the 2007 All-Africa Games
African Games competitors for Algeria
21st-century Algerian people